A sleigh, or sled, is a vehicle with runners for sliding.

Sleigh may also refer to:
Bobsleigh
Sleigh (surname)

See also
 Slay (disambiguation)
 SLED (disambiguation)
 Sledge (disambiguation)